Drum is the first official release by Local H, released in 1991. It was only available as a vinyl 7". It is the only material made for commercial release to include more than two official members of Local H, as it includes Matt Garcia on bass. The only other official release with more than two members was The '92 Demos, although it was not originally made for commercial release. It includes the same line-up as this EP.

Track listing
All songs by Local H.

Side A
 "1st Amendment Jitters" – 2:13
 "Ralph" – 3:00

Side B
 "Elephant" – 5:37

Personnel 
Scott Lucas – vocals, guitar
Matt Garcia – bass
Joe Daniels – drums
Jeff Murphy – engineering

1991 EPs
Local H EPs